The American Association for the History of Medicine is an American professional association dedicated to the study of medical history.

Background
It is the largest society dedicated to medical history in the United States, and the oldest such organization in North America. It was established in 1925 as the American Section of the International Society for the History of Medicine, and obtained its current name in 1958. Its first president was Fielding Hudson Garrison. Its official journal is the Bulletin of the History of Medicine, which is published quarterly. Its current membership is in excess of 1,000 people.

References

External links

Organizations established in 1925
Medical associations based in the United States
History organizations based in the United States
History of medicine